Nothing's Gonna Change the Way You Feel About Me Now is the fourth studio album by American musician Justin Townes Earle. It was released in March 2012 by Bloodshot Records.

Track listing

Personnel 
Justin Townes Earle – vocals and acoustic guitar
Skylar Wilson – organ, dream piano, acoustic piano, tambourine and claps
Paul Niehaus – electric and steel guitar
Bryn Davies – upright bass and bowed upright bass
Cory Younts – acoustic guitar, electric piano, percussion, tambourine, harmonica and harmony vocals
Amanda Shires – harmony vocals and claps
Vince Ilagan – claps
Jon-Paul Frappier – trumpet
Geoff Pfeiffer – saxophone
Bryan Owings - drums

References 

2012 albums
Justin Townes Earle albums
Bloodshot Records albums